Manchester Medics RUFC is an English rugby union club based in Manchester, which currently plays in the Counties adm 4 Lancashire & Cheshire for the 2022-23 season.

The club is formed primarily by medical students from the University of Manchester, but a number of doctors and non-medical students are also involved.

It is one of the largest, most successful and social societies within the medical school. The 1st XV regularly plays on Saturdays, as well as a competitive "pre-clinical XV" playing midweek in a North West Universities development league. The club has enjoyed considerable past success, most notably being crowned NAMS champions for the 2014-2015 and 2018-19 seasons.

Club honours 
National Association of Medical Schools Rugby Cup runners up: 2005–06
National Association of Medical Schools Rugby Plate winners: 2008–09
University of Manchester Campus League champions (3): 2008–09, 2009–10, 2010–11
War of the Roses winners (4): 2011–12, 2013–14, 2014–15, 2015–16, 2019-20
North Lancashire 2 champions: 2011–12
South Lancs/Cheshire 3 champions: 2012–13
South Lancs/Cheshire 2 champions: 2013–14
National Association of Medical Schools Rugby Cup winners: 2014–15, 2018-19
Cheshire (South) champions: 2015–16

Former captains
1986-87 Mike O'Connor
1987-88 Jonny Fields
1988-89 Simon Clarke
1996-97 Paul Dimitri
1997-98 Robin Calderwood
1998-99 Jim Edwards
1999-00 Seamus Grundy
2001-02 Ross Seaton
2002-03 Simon Robinson
2003-04 Andy McPartlin
2004-05 Dan Baird
2005-06 Sam McMahon
2006-07 Pete Coe
2007-08 Ali Konarski
2008-09 Richard Lowe
2009-10 Andrew Bevan
2010-11 Robbie Cooke
2011-12 Mike Woodhead
2012-13 Chris Davis
2013-14 Tom Morris
2014-15 Rob Davidson
2015-16 Thomas Jefferson
2016-17 Seth Rodger
2017-18 Alex Pett
2018-19 Dominic Quigley
2019-20 Charles Etchells
2020-20+1 Frankie Robinson
2020+1-22 Frank Hartley
2022-23 Ben Fitzjohn

References

English rugby union teams
University and college rugby union clubs in England